Nikolai Rimsky-Korsakov (1844–1908) was a Russian composer.

Rimsky-Korsakov may also refer to:
 Rimsky-Korsakov (film), a 1952 Soviet film by Gennadi Kazansky and Grigori Roshal
 4534 Rimskij-Korsakov, main belt asteroid 
 Rimsky-Korsakov Archipelago, a group of islands near Vladivostok
 Rimsky-Korsakov Apartment and Museum, a memorial museum in St. Petersburg, Russia

People with the surname
 Alexander Rimsky-Korsakov (1753–1840), Russian general
 Andrey Rimsky-Korsakov (1878–1940), Russian musicologist and son of Nikolai
 Ivan Rimsky-Korsakov (1754–1831), Russian courtier
 Mikhail Rimsky-Korsakov (1873–1951), Russian zoologist, eldest son of Nikolai
 Nadezhda Rimskaya-Korsakova (1848-1919), Russian pianist and composer, wife of Nikolai
 Voin Rimsky-Korsakov (1822–1871), Russian explorer and elder brother of Nikolai